East Bay Arts High School is a public high school located in Hayward, California and is part of the San Lorenzo Unified School District. The school has recently gone through many processes of possible closure due to low student population, and other. The school is still currently open and accepting new freshman thanks to multiple protests.

The Arts/Academics at EBA
Per its name, East Bay Arts High School is most well known by its college preparatory arts programs.ArtThe "Art" Department consists of the following courses: Drawing and Painting, Photography, and Theater.DanceThe "Dance" Department consists of the following courses: Hip Hop, and Ballet Folklorico which maintains focus on folk dances and historical choreography.MusicThe Music Department consists of the following courses: Digital Music, Choral, and the Symphonic Chamber Orchestra conducted by the school's string specialist, Amy Wilson

Clubs and After School
Some of the clubs associated with East Bay Arts High School, are reflective of the arts atmosphere. They are the Art Club which meets Tuesday after school in Room 205, the Black Student Union which meets Friday during lunch in room 706, the Chess Club which meets Thursdays during lunch in Room 962, Fusion by Jazz which meets Thursdays & Fridays 4:00 - 5:00 Dance Studio, Digital Game Creation which meets Tuesdays and Thursdays, the Gay-Straight Alliance which meets Fridays during lunch Room 223, the German Club which meets Tuesdays during lunch in Room 223, the Red Cross Club which meets Thursdays in room 205, and Sewing Club which meets Thursdays in the sewing room 3:45 - 5:00.

Expressions 
The school also has a yearly project called "expressions" which is one of its quarterly projects that requires all students to create an art project related to the determined theme for the year. These can be live performances as well as visual arts or creative writing. When it is time for art work to be presented for all the school to see, an entire day is dedicated to the event in which students observe the works of everyone else.

See also
Alameda County High Schools
San Lorenzo Unified School District

References

External links
 EBA High School Homepage

High schools in Alameda County, California
Public high schools in California
2005 establishments in California